is a Japanese Thoroughbred racehorse and sire. A specialist sprinter, he recorded his first important success in 2011 when he won the Grade 3 Keihan Hai at Kyoto Racecourse. In the following year he won once from his first four starts but then emerged as a world-class performer with wins in the Sprinters Stakes and the Hong Kong Sprint, becoming the first Japanese horse to win the latter race. Lord Kanaloa was even better in 2013 winning the Takamatsunomiya Kinen before stepping up in distance to take the Yasuda Kinen. In the autumn he repeated his wins in the Sprinters Stakes and the Hong Kong Sprint and ended the year rated as one of the best racehorses in the world.

Background
Lord Kanaloa is a bay horse with no white markings bred in Hokkaido, Japan by the K I Farm. His sire, King Kamehameha, was one of the best Japanese colts of his generation, beating a field including Heart's Cry and Daiwa Major in the 2004 Japanese Derby. His other winners as a breeding stallion include Rose Kingdom (Japan Cup), Belshazzar (Japan Cup Dirt), Rulership (Queen Elizabeth II Cup) and Apapane (Japanese Fillies' Triple Crown). Lord Kanaloa's dam, Lady Blossom, won five of her twenty-four races between 1998 and 2001, and was a descendant of Somethingroyal, the dam of Secretariat and Sir Gaylord.

In July 2008, Lord Kanaloa was sent to the JRHA Select Foal Sales but was not sold. Lord Kanaloa entered the ownership of the Lord Horse Club and was sent into training with Takayuki Yasuda. The horse is named after a figure in Hawaiian mythology.

Racing career

2010: two-year-old season
Lord Kanaloa began his racing career on 5 December 2010 when he won a race at Kokura Racecourse.

2011: three-year-old season
After finishing second on his three-year-old debut in January, Lord Kanaloa contested a race over 1200 metres at Kokura Racecourse on 16 April 2011 and won by three and a half lengths from fifteen opponents. In the following month he finished second when tried over a mile but then reverted to sprinting and won over 1200m at Kyoto Racecourse. After the summer break he returned to Kyoto to win the Kyoraku Stakes on 6 November and was then moved up to Grade 3 class for the weight-for-age Keihan Cup over the same course and distance twenty days later. Ridden by Yuichi Fukunaga he started the 3/5 favourite and won by one and a half lengths from the five-year-old mare Grand Prix Angel.

2012: four-year-old season
Lord Kanaloa was campaigned exclusively over 1200m in 2012, beginning with a win in the Grade 3 Silk Road Stakes at Kyoto in January by two and a half lengths at odds of 2/5. He then sustained three consecutive defeats. Moving up to Grade 1 class for the first time he finished third to the mare Curren Chan (also trained by Yasuda) in Takamatsunomiya Kinen at Chukyo Racecourse and in June he was beaten by Dream Valentino when odds-on favourite the Grade 3 Hakodate Sprint Stakes. By the time Lord Kanaloa returned in autumn Yasunari Iwata had replaced Fukunaga as the horse's regular jockey. In the Grade 2 Centaur Stakes at Hanshin Racecourse in September he started favourite but was beaten a head by the three-year-old filly Epice Arome.

On 30 September at Nakayama, Lord Kanaloa contested the Grade 1 Sprinters Stakes in which he was opposed by Curren Chan, Epice Arome and Dream Valentino as well as the leading Hong Kong sprinters Lucky Nine and Little Bridge. The race was run in high winds caused by the approach of Typhoon Jelawat. Starting at odds of 17/5, Lord Kanaloa raced behind the leaders before making progress in the final quarter mile, taking the lead inside the last 100m and winning by three-quarters of a length from Curren Chan in a course record time of 1:06.7. On his final appearance of the season, Lord Kanaloa was sent to Sha Tin Racecourse on 9 December for the Hong Kong Sprint. The local runners included Lucky Nine, Flying Blue and Joy And Fun while the international challenge was augmented by Curren Chan and the Manikato Stakes winner Sea Siren from Australia. Lord Kanaloa was always among the leaders before taking the lead in the straight and drawing away to win by two and a half lengths from the locally trained gelding Cerise Cherry. No horses from Japan had won the Hong Kong Sprint before. After the race Yasuda said that Lord Kanaloa would be "a pioneer for Japanese sprinters" and could compete anywhere in the world.

2013: five-year-old season

On his debut as a five-year-old, Lord Kanaloa carried top weight of 128 pounds in the Grade 3 Hankyu Hai at Hanshin on 24 February. Racing over a longer distance of 1400m he started the 3/5 favourite and won by three quarters of a length from Majin Prosper. On 24 March, the horse made a second attempt to win the Takamatsunomiya Kinen and was made the 30/100 favourite against sixteen opponents. He recorded his third Grade 1 victory, going clear in the straight and holding the late run of Dream Valentino by one and a quarter lengths. The winning time of 1:08.01 was a new course record. After the race Iwata commented "I think he is the strongest sprinter in the world, so I thought he should not be beaten against domestic rivals like this". Lord Kanaloa's connections then moved the horse up in distance to 1600m (one mile) for the first time to contest the Grade 1 Yasuda Kinen at Tokyo Racecourse. He started the 3/1 favourite in a field which included Verxina (Victoria Mile), Grand Prix Boss (2011 NHK Mile Cup), Curren Black Hill (2012 NHK Mile Cup) and Glorious Days (Hong Kong Stewards' Cup). Racing down the centre of the track, he took the lead 100m from the finish and won by a neck and three-quarters of a length from Shonan Mighty and Danon Shark.

On his return from the summer break, Lord Kanaloa returned to sprinting when he ran for the second time in the Centaur Stakes on 8 September. He started the 2/5 favourite but was beaten a neck by the four-year-old Hakusan Moon, to whom he was attempting to concede five pounds. On 29 September, Lord Kanaloa met Hakusan Moon at level weights in the Sprinters' Stakes and started the 30/100 favourite in a field which also included Majin Prosper and Grand Prix Boss. He won the race for a second time, beating Hakusan Moon by three quarters of a length with the 159/1 outsider Mayano Ryujin a neck away in third place. On 8 December, Lord Kanaloa ended his career as he attempted to repeat his 2012 success in the Hong Kong Sprint. He started the 11/8 favourite against the leading local sprinters Lucky Nine, Sterling City and Frederick Engels, with a strong European challenge headed by Sole Power and the Nunthorpe Stakes winner Jwala. Iwata restrained the horses in the early stages before making progress in the straight. He overtook Rich Tapestry 200m from the finish and accelerated clear of the field to win impressively by five lengths from Sole Power.

Assessment
In the 2012 World Thoroughbred Rankings Lord Kanaloa was rated the tenth best sprinter in the world and the fifty-seventh best horse in any category. At the JRA Awards in January 2013, Lord Kanaloa was named Japanese Champion Sprinter or Miler of 2012, receiving 283 of the 289 votes. At the same ceremony he finished second in the voting for the JRA Award for Best Older Male Horse and fourth in the poll for Japanese Horse of the Year behind Gentildonna, Gold Ship and Orfevre.

Following his win in the 2013 Hong Kong Sprint the Racing Post rated Lord Kanaloa the joint-third best racehorse of the year, behind Treve and Wise Dan, and level with Black Caviar and Toronado.

In January 2014 he was named Japanese Horse of the Year for 2013 (receiving 209 out of 280 votes), Japanese Champion Sprinter or Miler (receiving all 280 votes). He became the first sprinter/miler to receive Japanese Horse of the Year since Taiki Shuttle in 1998. However, he lost to Orfevre in JRA Award for Best Older Male Horse.

On 12 June 2018, Lord Kanaloa was inducted in the Japan Racing Association Hall of Fame.

Stud record

Notable stock

c = colt, f = filly, g = gelding

Pedigree

References

2008 racehorse births
Racehorses bred in Japan
Racehorses trained in Japan
Thoroughbred family 2-s